Königsbach-Stein is a municipality in the district of Enz in Baden-Württemberg in Germany. It is located on Bertha Benz Memorial Route.

History
After meditization, it was assigned to the Amt of Königsbach on 24 July 1813. Stein was reassigned again to the district of Pforzheim in 1920 and was joined on 1 April 1924 by Königsbach. Stein and Königsbach merged to form Königsbach-Stein on 1 July 1974. On 20 June 1989,  of the Steiner Mittelberg, a local mountain, became the  Federally-protected nature reserve (Naturschutzgebiet).

Karl-Möller-Straße in Königsbach-Stein is named after author Karl Leopold von Möller.

Geography
The primary watercourse within the municipal area is the Kämpfelbach. The lowest elevation in the municipality,  Normalnull (NN), is found where the Kämpfelbach flows into Remchingen. The highest elevation,  NN, is found at the Langenwald campsite.

Coat of arms
Königsbach-Stein's municipal coat of arms were awarded by government of the Enz district on 16 November 1992. It is divided into four sections by quartering. In the top left quarter is a bend in red on a golden field, followed by a bust of a king upon a silver field in the top right. The bottom left quarter, a pair of silver calipers measures a stone on a blue field, and the final quarter is made up by a blue wavy bar on a silver field.

Citations

External links
 Official website (in German)

Enzkreis
Baden